Agapitovskaya is a rural locality (a village) in Verkhovskoye Rural Settlement, Tarnogsky District, Vologda Oblast, Russia. The population was 13 as of 2002.

Geography 
Agapitovskaya is located 45 km west of Tarnogsky Gorodok (the district's administrative centre) by road. Palkinskaya is the nearest rural locality.

References 

Rural localities in Tarnogsky District